License to Chill is the twenty-fifth studio album by American singer-songwriter Jimmy Buffett and was released on July 13, 2004, by Mailboat and RCA Nashville.

On this album, Buffett has many duets with noted contemporary country music artists, on country songs including "Hey, Good Lookin'" by Hank Williams. This rendition reached No. 8 on the Billboard country singles charts; another single, "Trip Around the Sun" (a duet with Martina McBride) reached No. 20. The album features the most covers he's recorded for an album – 11 of the 16 songs are covers. It sold 238,600 copies in its first week of release according to Nielsen SoundScan and became his  album to reach No. 1 on the Billboard 200 album chart.

This is also the name of his 2004 concert tour, which included two shows at Boston's Fenway Park. In November 2005, Mailboat Records released Live at Fenway Park, a live recording of the two shows. Included was a 55-minute DVD of the show.

Track listing

Personnel
 Al Anderson – guitar
 Tony Brown – keyboards
 Eric Darken – percussion 
 Stuart Duncan – fiddle
 Robert Greenidge – steel drums, timbales
 Doyle Grisham – pedal steel guitar
 Roger Guth – drums
 Will Kimbrough – guitar
 Sonny Landreth – guitar
 Mac McAnally – guitar, mandolin, backing vocals
 Ralph MacDonald – percussion
 Bill Payne – keyboards
 Buster Somar – harmonica
 Michael Utley – keyboards
 Glenn Worf – bass guitar
 Jimmy Buffett – guitar

Backing Vocals
 Tim Bender
 Bekka Bramlett
 Wes Hightower
 J. L. Jamison
 Stan Kellam
 Charleston Miles
 Buddy Owen
 Jim Photoglo
 Mike Ramos
 Nadirah Shakoor
 Harry Stinson
 Chris Walsh
 Rachel Wilson

Charts

Weekly charts

Year-end charts

References

2004 albums
Jimmy Buffett albums
Mailboat Records albums
RCA Records albums
Vocal duet albums
Albums produced by Michael Utley
Albums produced by Mac McAnally